Fabian Molina (born 8 July 1990 in Uster) is a Swiss politician of the Social Democratic Party (SP) and a member of the National Council.

Political career 
Fabian Molina joined the SP in 2006. From 2007 to 2009, he was a board member of SP Illnau-Effretikon. At the same time, in 2008, he founded the social democratic youth wing (Juso) Illnau-Effretikon. In 2009, he was elected Co-President of the Juso Canton Zurich. In 2010, he was elected to the municipal council of Illnau-Effretikon, where he served until his resignation in 2016. In 2015, he was a candidate for the Swiss National Council on the list of SP in the Canton of Zurich. On national level, Fabian Molina presided the Juso Switzerland from March 2014 and announced his resignation as a president in June 2016 at Juso Switzerland's 2016 annual meeting and expressed a desire for a female successor. In August 2017, he joined the Zurich Cantonal Council for the Pfäffikon constituency.
On 15 March 2018 he moved up as National Council after his predecessor Tim Guldimann's resignation. In the 2019 parliamentary elections, Molina was able to defend its seat in the National Council with 81,905 votes.

Political profile 
Molina was Youth Secretary at the Swiss national labour union Unia from 2011 to 2014. He is also a member of Amnesty International, Greenpeace, Group Switzerland without Army (GSoA), Public Eye, and Solidar Suisse. From early 2017 to 2018, Molina held a position as a research assistant at the Swiss non-governmental organisation Swissaid and has been Co-President since 6 June 2019.

A prominent figure in national media, he has raised regular attention both in national and international press.
He called, for instance, to hoist the multi-coloured Peace Flag instead of the Swiss Flag on 1 August 2014 (Switzerland's national day) to commemorate 100 years of the general mobilization for World War I. In 2015, in cooperation with other political groups, Molina and his Juso took the referendum against the new Intelligence Service Act (Nachrichtendienstgesetz).
Furthermore, he took a leading role in the vote on the popular initiative "Stop Speculation on Food Crops" ("Keine Spekulation mit Nahrungsmitteln!") that came to a popular vote on 2 February 2016, and was rejected.

Other 
Raised in Illnau-Effretikon, he attended the Kantonsschule Büelrain in Winterthur from 2006 to 2010. After graduating from high school in 2011, he began his studies in history and philosophy at the University of Zurich.
Molina's father was a left-wing activist in Chile in the 1970s and sought refuge in Switzerland after 13 prison stays under General Augusto Pinochet’s authoritarian rule. Fabian Molina has referred to his father's political persecution as a driving force in his political convictions and activism.

References

External links
  
 

Living people
Politicians from Zürich
Academic staff of the University of Zurich
1990 births
Members of the National Council (Switzerland)
Social Democratic Party of Switzerland politicians
21st-century Swiss politicians